Antonín Rosa (born 12 November 1986) is a Czech football midfielder currently playing for FC Oberlausitz Neugersdorf.

Rosa is the son of another Antonín Rosa, after whom he is named. His father played for Bohemians.

References

External links
 
 
 
 

Czech footballers
Czech Republic youth international footballers
Czech Republic under-21 international footballers
1986 births
Living people
Czech First League players
FK Teplice players
FK Chmel Blšany players
FK Mladá Boleslav players
MFK Ružomberok players
Slovak Super Liga players
Sportspeople from Ústí nad Labem
Association football defenders
FC Oberlausitz Neugersdorf players
Czech expatriate footballers
Expatriate footballers in Germany